Coyote Creek is a stream in the Richardson Bay watershed, draining Tamalpais-Homestead Valley, California (Tam Valley) eastward into Richardson Bay, Marin County, California, United States. The stream originates on Coyote Ridge and flows  to the bay at the south end of Bothin Marsh.

History
The Richardson Bay watershed is located on the aboriginal lands of the Coast Miwok. Spanish colonization began in neighboring Sausalito, California, in 1775, when Juan de Ayala sailed the first ship (the San Carlos) into San Francisco Bay. These explorers named the area Saucelito (“little willows”) after the vegetation spotted from shipboard. When the Mission San Rafael Arcángel, established in 1817, was secularized by the Mexican government in 1834, the mission lands were granted to prominent Californios as ranchos. The Rancho Corte Madera del Presidio (literally, “place where wood is cut for the Presidio”) included a sawmill for processing redwood trees, cattle and horse ranches, a brickyard, and a stone quarry.  Sausalito became an important ferry port, connecting Marin to San Francisco. The railroad brought supplies from the north to be shipped across San Francisco Bay.

Habitat and ecology
Historically, Coyote Creek hosted California golden beaver (Castor canadensis subauratus) whose beaver dams likely played a role in removing sediment and improving over-summering habitat for steelhead and salmon smolt.

See also
List of watercourses in the San Francisco Bay Area

References

External links
 
Richardson Bay Watershed Map
 Guide to San Francisco Bay Area Creeks

Rivers of Marin County, California
Rivers of Northern California
Tributaries of San Francisco Bay